Blepharistemma serratum is a species of plant in the family Rhizophoraceae, and the only the species of the genus Blepharistemma.

References

Monotypic Malpighiales genera
Rhizophoraceae